Eleni Goula (born 18 August 1990) is a Greek female former water polo player. She was part of the Greece women's national water polo team that won the gold medal at the 2011 World Aquatics Championships.

See also
 List of world champions in women's water polo
 List of World Aquatics Championships medalists in water polo

References

1990 births
Living people
Greek female water polo players
Place of birth missing (living people)
World Aquatics Championships medalists in water polo
21st-century Greek women